Amado Ignacio Espino III is a Filipino politician from Pangasinan, Philippines. He is a former Governor of Pangasinan. Espino was first elected Governor in 2016 and was re-elected in 2019.

References

External links
Province of Pangasinan Official Website

Living people
Governors of Pangasinan
PDP–Laban politicians
1977 births